Poarta may refer to several places in Romania:

 Poarta, a village in Bran Commune, Brașov County
 Poarta, a village in Fărăgău Commune, Mureș County
 Poarta, a tributary of the Priboiasa in Vâlcea County
 Poarta (Turcu), a river in Brașov County